The 2004 World Single Distance Speed Skating Championships were held between 12 and 14 March 2004 in the Taereung Indoor Ice Rink, Seoul, South Korea.

Schedule

Medal summary

Men's events

Women's events

Medal table

External links
 ISU results

2004 World Single Distance
World Single Distance Speed Skating Championships
2004 in South Korean sport
International speed skating competitions hosted by South Korea
Sport in Seoul
World Single Distance Speed Skating Championships